Dave Mackintosh is a Scottish drummer, best known as the former drummer for the power metal band DragonForce. Mackintosh also appeared on The Power Cosmic and Atlantis Ascendant albums, by the symphonic black metal band, Bal-Sagoth.

On 3 June 2014, it was announced that Mackintosh had left DragonForce to "pursue his first love of progressive rock" and is currently the drummer for Soulweaver.

Influences 

He is influenced by Neil Peart, Mercury Caronia, Mike Portnoy, Tommy Aldridge, Charlie Benante, Ingo Schwichtenberg, Nicko McBrain, Jonny Maudling and Vinnie Paul.

References

External links 
 

Living people
DragonForce members
English heavy metal drummers
British heavy metal singers
1970 births
21st-century drummers